Nicolae Păun (born  9 November 1964) is a Romani-Romanian politician. He is the president of the Party of the Roma, and has held the one reserved seat for Romani people in the Romanian Chamber of Deputies since 2000. Since 2000, he has also been the president of the Committee for Human Rights, Religious Affairs and National Minorities in the Chamber of Deputies.

Nicolae Păun is one of only two ethnic Romani members of parliament in Romania, the other one being Mădălin Voicu of the Social Democratic Party.

External links 
Nicolae Păun's page at the Romanian Chamber of Deputies

Members of the Chamber of Deputies (Romania)
Romanian Romani people
Romani politicians
Romanian politicians of ethnic minority parties
1964 births
Living people